Marcel Schantl (born 17 August 2000) is an Austrian footballer who plays as a midfielder for TSV Hartberg.

Club career
On 28 August 2020, he joined FC Blau-Weiß Linz on loan with a purchase option.

Career statistics

Club

Notes

References

2000 births
Living people
Austrian footballers
Association football midfielders
TSV Hartberg players
FC Blau-Weiß Linz players
Austrian Regionalliga players
Austrian Football Bundesliga players
2. Liga (Austria) players